The 1998 King of the Ring was the sixth annual King of the Ring professional wrestling pay-per-view (PPV) event produced by the World Wrestling Federation (WWF, now WWE) that featured the 12th King of the Ring tournament. It took place on June 28, 1998, at the Pittsburgh Civic Arena in Pittsburgh, Pennsylvania.

Nine matches were scheduled on the event's card. The main event was a First Blood match featuring Kane defeating Stone Cold Steve Austin for the WWF Championship. The other main match was a Hell in a Cell match featuring The Undertaker defeating Mankind. Featured matches on the undercard included the 1998 King of the Ring tournament final between Ken Shamrock and The Rock, which Shamrock won to win the tournament. Another prominent match was a tag team match for the WWF Tag Team Championship (which was only added to the card earlier that morning) between the New Age Outlaws defeating The Midnight Express, to retain the championship.

This event produced the best-known Hell in a Cell bout in history, pitting The Undertaker vs. Mankind; Michael Landsberg of TSN's Off the Record in 2002 called it "maybe the most famous match ever". Less than two minutes into the contest, The Undertaker threw Mankind from the top of the 16-foot (5 m) high cell through the Spanish announcers' table. The footage of that fall has since become one of the most used and viewed videos in professional wrestling history. A few minutes later in the match in another memorable moment, The Undertaker chokeslammed Mankind through the top of the cell, briefly knocking him legitimately unconscious.

Production

Background
King of the Ring was a pay-per-view (PPV) event held annually in June by the World Wrestling Federation (WWF, now WWE) since 1993. The PPV featured the King of the Ring tournament, a single-elimination tournament that was established in 1985 and held annually until 1991, with the exception of 1990; these early tournaments were held as special non-televised house shows. The winner of the tournament was crowned "King of the Ring." Unlike the non-televised events, the PPV did not feature all of the tournament's matches. Instead, several of the qualifying matches preceded the event with the final few matches then taking place at the pay-per-view. There were also other matches that took place at the event as it was a traditional three-hour pay-per-view. Considered as one of the WWF's "Big Five" PPVs, along with the Royal Rumble, WrestleMania, SummerSlam, and Survivor Series, the company's five biggest shows of the year, the 1998 event was the sixth King of the Ring PPV and 12th tournament overall. It was held on June 28, 1998 at the Pittsburgh Civic Arena in Pittsburgh, Pennsylvania.

Storylines
The main feud heading into King of the Ring was between Stone Cold Steve Austin and Kane over the WWF Championship. On the June 1st episode of Raw Is War, Kane defeated The Undertaker to become the number one contender for the WWF Championship. The previous month at Over The Edge, Austin retained the WWF Championship against Dude Love despite the efforts of Vince McMahon as special referee and Gerald Brisco and Pat Patterson as time keeper and ring announcer respectively. On the June 22nd episode of Raw Is War, McMahon announced that the match between Austin and Kane would be a first blood match a match in which a wrestler who makes his opponent bleed from his face or mouth would be declared the winner. Kane through an electronic voice box declared that if he lost the match he would set himself on fire. Later that night, Austin came to the ring and accepted the match at King of the Ring. Kane came out and had fake blood drenched from the ceiling on Austin.

Another feud heading into King of the Ring was between Mankind and The Undertaker in a Hell in a Cell match.
This would be the second Hell in a Cell match on PPV with the first being the one between Shawn Michaels and Undertaker at Badd Blood: In Your House the previous year. On the June 15 episode of Raw Is War, Mankind and Kane teamed up against Stone Cold Steve Austin and Undertaker in the second Hell in a Cell match. The bout ended in a no-contest with Undertaker attacking Paul Bearer (who was aligned with Mankind and Kane) inside the cell, while Austin attacked Kane at the top of the structure. This led to a third Hell in a Cell match between Mankind and Undertaker at King of the Ring.

King of the Ring bracket

Event

Preliminary matches

The pay-per-view opened with a six-man tag team match between Kaientai (Funaki, Men's Teioh, and Dick Togo) and the team of Taka Michinoku and The Headbangers (Mosh and Thrasher). At the climax of the match, Michinoku executed a Michinoku Driver on Funaki for the win.

It was followed by the first semifinal of the King of the Ring tournament between Ken Shamrock and Jeff Jarrett. Jarrett's manager Tennessee Lee interfered in the match as he and Jarrett targeted Shamrock's ankle but Shamrock made a comeback by hitting a running kick and a powerslam on Jarrett and applied an ankle lock on Jarrett to make him submit.

The next semifinal featured Dan Severn against The Rock. Nation of Domination interfered in the match as Kama Mustafa and Mark Henry distracted the referee, allowing D-Lo Brown to attack Severn and nail a frog splash, helping Rock to win the match.

Next, Al Snow and Head took on Too Much (Brian Christopher and Scott Taylor), with Jerry Lawler serving as the special guest referee. Lawler cheated Snow out of the victory numerous times during the match, allowing Christopher to attach a bottle of Head & Shoulders shampoo to Head and pin it for the win.

In the next match, D-Generation X member X-Pac took on The Nation of Domination member Owen Hart. Mark Henry interfered in the match on Hart's behalf but then Vader showed up and collided with Henry. Hart had applied the Sharpshooter on X-Pac but the referee was distracted, allowing X-Pac's DX teammate Chyna to hit a DDT on Hart and X-Pac pinned him for the win.

Next, The New Age Outlaws (Billy Gunn and Road Dogg) defended the Tag Team Championship against The Midnight Express (Bodacious Bart and Bombastic Bob). Jim Cornette tried to interfere on Express' behalf by using his racket but Gunn stopped him and Chyna nailed a low blow to Cornette and then Outlaws tossed Holly head-first on the ropes for the win to retain the titles.

Later, The Rock took on Ken Shamrock in the final round of the King of the Ring tournament. After a back and forth match, Shamrock applied an ankle lock on Rock to make him submit and win the 1998 King of the Ring tournament.

Hell in a Cell match

The penultimate match of the event was a Hell in a Cell match between The Undertaker and Mankind (Mick Foley) that has become one of the most watched and discussed in professional wrestling history due to the bumps Foley sustained at his own request and with his full participation. 

Before this match, Foley and Terry Funk were discussing the previous year's Hell in a Cell at Badd Blood: In Your House that featured the Undertaker backdropping and slamming Shawn Michaels onto the chain-link ceiling of the cage. Foley and Funk were brainstorming ideas about how to top that match when Funk said, "laughing, 'maybe you should let him throw you off the top of the cage.'" Fittingly for Foley, the King of the Ring was scheduled to take place that year at the Civic Arena in Pittsburgh. Foley himself trained to become a professional wrestler at Dominic DeNucci's wrestling school in nearby Freedom, Pennsylvania, only  from Pittsburgh, bringing his career full circle.

Early minutes into the match, Undertaker tossed Mankind from the top of the cell onto the Spanish announce table in what would become one of the most iconic watched videos in specially WWF history and generally professional wrestling history. Midway through the match, Undertaker dropped Mankind again from the top of the cell by chokeslamming him through  the roof. Near the end of the match, Mankind spread thumbtacks in the ring and applied a Mandible claw on Undertaker but Undertaker dropped him on the thumbtacks and executed a Chokeslam and a Tombstone on Mankind onto the thumbtacks for the win.

Main event match
The main event was a First Blood match, in which Stone Cold Steve Austin defended the WWF Championship against Kane. The Hell in a Cell was lowered, then raised 8 feet, then lowered again when Mankind interfered in the match on Kane's behalf until The Undertaker made the save and attempted to hit Mankind with a chair but Mankind ducked and Austin was accidentally hit with the chair instead, which busted Austin's face. Austin would then attack Kane with a chair to make him bleed but the referee saw Austin bleeding, therefore the referee awarded Kane the win and the title.

Reception

In 2002, Scott Keith of InsidePulse gave the event a rating of Recommended, stating, "The Bottom Line: Wildly divergent opinions on you-know-what aside, there was some really solid wrestling in the form of Rock-Shamrock and NAO-NME. Owen-XPac narrowly misses match of the night honors. And Foley-UT is really worth a look, if only to make your own judgment on it."

In 2003, Dan of Cult of Whatever gave the event a rating of 8/10, stating, "You won’t need much persuasion However if you are looking at it as a PPV overall, it is not bad, ok it is not a great PPV but it has its good points, The Austin/Kane match is good, and the other mid card matches are enjoyable. As you would expect my favourite match was Undertaker/Mankind, it was just amazing. If you buy this you will almost certainly enjoy it as much as I did."

In 2017, Kevin Pantoja of 411Mania gave the event a rating of 5.0 [Not So Good], stating, "Judging by the first few matches, this was on pace to be a horrendous Pay-Per-View. Once we got past the Semi-Finals and dumb Too Cool match, everything else was pretty solid. The King of the Ring Finals were pretty good and the main event was an enjoyable Attitude Era brawl. Obviously, the key to the show was the memorable Hell in a Cell match, which is a must see for any wrestling fan, even if it is just for historical purposes."

Aftermath
The following night on Raw Is War, Austin defeated Kane to regain the WWF Championship and began a feud with both Kane and the Undertaker, which lasted through September. At Fully Loaded: In Your House in July, Austin and Undertaker defeated Kane and Mankind for the WWF Tag Team Championship, but dropped the titles back to them in a fatal four-way match on the August 10 episode of Raw Is War.

Kane and the Undertaker were gradually revealed to be in cahoots with each other over the WWF Championship. As part of the storyline, Kane turned on Mankind at SummerSlam, losing the tag team titles to the New Age Outlaws, and Undertaker ordered his brother not to interfere in his title match with Austin in the main event. The feud culminated in a match at Breakdown: In Your House in September, where Kane and Undertaker simultaneously pinned Austin. This led to a match between Kane and Undertaker at Judgment Day: In Your House in October, where Austin, who was the special referee, attacked both men and refused to count a fall. After the match, Undertaker turned on Kane and reunited with Paul Bearer, reigniting their feud.

Results

References

1998
Professional wrestling in Pittsburgh
1998 in Pennsylvania
Events in Pittsburgh
1998 WWF pay-per-view events
June 1998 events in the United States